Zafar Moeen Nasir was the former Vice Chancellor of the University of the Punjab.

He resigned from his post when the Government of Punjab pressurized him to handover 2-kanal land of the University near Lahore's historical site Chauburji to a religious party for constructing a seminary there.

References

Vice-Chancellors of universities in Pakistan
Pakistani academic administrators
University of the Punjab people
Pakistani educators